Mohammad Ali Jum'aa Esnaani (born May 13, 1984 in Libya) is a Libyan football midfielder. He currently plays for Tunisian club CA Bizertin.

Esnany is also a member of the Libya national football team, and was part of the Libyan Olympic squad that won the silver medal in the 2005 Mediterranean Games.

References

External links

1984 births
Living people
Libyan footballers
Libya international footballers
Association football midfielders
Al-Ittihad Club (Tripoli) players
Expatriate footballers in Tunisia
US Monastir (football) players
CA Bizertin players
2012 Africa Cup of Nations players
Mediterranean Games bronze medalists for Libya
Mediterranean Games medalists in football
Competitors at the 2005 Mediterranean Games
Libyan Premier League players